KODS (103.7 FM) is a commercial radio station licensed to Carnelian Bay, California, broadcasting to the Reno, Nevada and Lake Tahoe areas. KODS airs a classic hits music format branded as "The River" (a local reference to the Truckee River).  The station's studios are located on Matley Lane in East Reno, and its transmitter is located on Slide Mountain.

History
The station, now owned by Reno Media Group, began as KNLT in 1970 with a transmitter on Brockway Summit, between Truckee, CA and Lake Tahoe. Its signal could be heard only in Truckee and in a small section of Tahoe's north shore, including Kings Beach and Carnelian Bay. Tom Quinn and a handful of investors purchased the station, then known as KEZC, in 1982. Within two years, Quinn petitioned the FCC to increase the station's power and he relocated the transmitter to Slide Mountain overlooking Reno, Carson City and Lake Tahoe. The station, with new call-letters KHTX and known as "K-Hits 104," had instant ratings success in the Reno radio market. This allowed Quinn to purchase a second station serving the Fresno, California area and then a third in Las Vegas, Nevada. In September 1988, KHTZ, as the station had become known the previous year, changed format from Top 40 to oldies and its call letters to KODS. In doing so, the station regained its position as the top-rated station in Reno. In the late 1990s, KODS began using the nickname "The River" and in Incline Village the nickname "Fun 101" reflecting its use of a translator at 101.3 FM. Except during specialty programs, KODS eventually dropped most of its 1950s and early 1960s music and thus transitioned to a classic hits rather than oldies format.

KODS is now part of the nine-station Reno Media Group/Americom family of stations.

Translators
KODS also broadcasts on the following FM translators:

References

External links
Official Website

ODS
Classic hits radio stations in the United States
Radio stations established in 1972